Otmar Mácha (2 October 1922 in Mariánské Hory, Ostrava 
– 14 December 2006 in Pardubice) was a Czech composer. He was member of the Quattro group of Czech composers with Sylvie Bodorová, Luboš Fišer and Zdeněk Lukáš.

Works
Operas:
 Polapená nevěra (Infidelity Unmasked 1958)
 Jezero Ukereve (Lake Ukereve 1963)
 Svatba na oko (Feigned Wedding)
 Tarzanova smrt (1963)
 Nenávistná láska (2002)
 Metamorphoses

References

1922 births
2006 deaths
Czech composers
Czech male composers
Musicians from Ostrava
20th-century Czech male musicians
Czechoslovak musicians